The 1986 Mr. Olympia contest was an IFBB professional bodybuilding competition held on October 11, 1986, at the Veterans Memorial Auditorium in Columbus, Ohio.

Results

Total prize money awarded was $120,000.

Notable events

Lee Haney won his third consecutive Mr. Olympia title
Last Mr Olympia competition for Tom Platz

References

External links 
 Mr. Olympia

 1986
1986 in American sports
Mr. Olympia
1986 in bodybuilding